The Underground Railroad is a historical fiction novel by American author Colson Whitehead, published by Doubleday in 2016. The alternate history novel tells the story of Cora, a slave in the Antebellum South during the 19th century, who makes a bid for freedom from her Georgia plantation by following the Underground Railroad, which the novel depicts as a rail transport system with safe houses and secret routes. The book was a critical and commercial success, hitting the bestseller lists and winning several literary awards, including the Pulitzer Prize for Fiction, the National Book Award for Fiction, the Arthur C. Clarke Award, and the 2017 Andrew Carnegie Medal for Excellence. A TV miniseries adaptation, written and directed by Barry Jenkins, was released in May 2021.

Plot
The book alternates between the perspective of the lead character, Cora, and chapters told from a different character's perspective. The featured characters are: Ajarry, Cora's grandmother; Ridgeway, a slave catcher; Stevens, a South Carolina doctor conducting a social experiment; Ethel, the wife of a North Carolina station agent; Caesar, a fellow slave who escapes the plantation with Cora; and Mabel, Cora's mother. The chapter locations are: Georgia, South Carolina, North Carolina, Tennessee, Indiana, and (an undefined) "North".

Cora is a slave on a plantation in Georgia and an outcast after her mother Mabel ran off without her. She resents Mabel for escaping, although it is later revealed that her mother tried to return to Cora but died from a snake bite and never reached her. Caesar approaches Cora about a plan to flee. Reluctant at first, she eventually agrees as her situation with her master and fellow slaves worsens. During their escape, they encounter a group of slave catchers, who capture Cora's young friend Lovey. Cora is forced to kill a twelve-year-old boy to protect herself and Caesar, eliminating any possibility of merciful treatment should she be recaptured. With the help of an inexperienced abolitionist, Cora and Caesar find the Underground Railroad, depicted as a literal underground train system that runs throughout the south, transporting runaways northwards. They take a train to South Carolina.

Upon learning of their escape, Ridgeway begins a hunt for the pair, largely in revenge for Mabel, who is the only escapee he has ever failed to capture. Cora and Caesar have taken up comfortable residence in South Carolina under assumed names. South Carolina is enacting a program where the government owns former slaves but employs them, provides medical treatment, and gives them communal housing. The two enjoy their time there and put off the decision to leave until Cora learns of plans to sterilize black women and use black men as test subjects in an experiment to track the spread and degenerative effects of syphilis. Ridgeway arrives before the two can leave and Cora is forced to return to the Railroad alone. She later learns that Caesar was killed by an angry mob after having been caught and jailed by Ridgeway.

Cora eventually arrives in a closed-down station in North Carolina. She is found by Martin, the son of the station's former operator. North Carolina has recently decided to abolish slavery, using indentured servants instead, and violently executes any runaway slaves found in the state (as well as some freedmen). Martin, terrified of what the North Carolinians might do to an abolitionist, hides Cora in his attic for several months. Cora becomes ill and is reluctantly treated by Martin's wife, Ethel. While Cora is down from the attic, a raid is conducted on the house, and she is recaptured by Ridgeway, while Martin and Ethel are executed by the mob.

Ridgeway takes Cora back toward Georgia, detouring through Tennessee to return another slave to his master. While stopped in Tennessee, Ridgeway's traveling party is attacked by the free-born Royal and two escaped slaves, who release Cora. Cora travels to a farm in Indiana owned by a free black man named Valentine, along with Royal. The farm is populated by a number of freedmen and escapees, living and working in harmony. Royal, an operator on the Railroad, begins a romantic relationship with Cora, although she remains hesitant because of a rape by other slaves in her childhood.

A small faction of freedmen, fearing that their peaceful life will be ruined by the presence of escaped slaves, oppose the harboring of non-members of the community. Eventually, the farm is burned and many people, including Royal, are killed in a raid by white Hoosiers. Various theories are held concerning the source of the attack. Ridgeway recaptures Cora and forces her to take him to a closed-down Railroad station nearby. When they arrive, she pushes him down a flight of stairs, severely injuring him. When last seen, he is whispering thoughts on the "American imperative" to Homer, who writes them in his journal. Cora then runs off down the tracks. Eventually, she emerges from underground to find a caravan traveling out West. She is given a ride by one of the wagons' black drivers.

Literary influences and parallels
In the "Acknowledgments", Whitehead mentions two famous escaped slaves: "Frederick Douglass and Harriet Jacobs, obviously." While in Jacobs's native North Carolina, Cora has to hide in an attic where, like Jacobs, she is not able to stand, but like her can observe the outside life through a hole that "had been carved from the inside, the work of a previous occupant". Martin Ebel, who observed this parallel in a review for the Swiss Tages-Anzeiger, also observes that the "Freedom Trail", where the victims of North Carolinian lynchings hang from trees, has a historic predecessor in the crosses the Romans raised along the Appian Way to kill the slaves who had joined Spartacus' slave rebellion, written on by Arthur Koestler in his novel The Gladiators. Ridgeway reminds Ebel of inspector Javert, the hero's merciless persecutor in Victor Hugo's Les misérables.

In The New Yorker, Kathryn Schulz likens Ridgeway to both Captain Ahab of Moby-Dick and the slave catcher August Pullman of the television series Underground: "Ridgeway ... and August Pullman, in "Underground," are Ahab-like characters, privately and demonically obsessed with tracking down specific fugitives". Both Ahab and Ridgeway have a soft spot for a black boy: Ahab for the cabin-boy Pip, and Ridgeway for 10-year-old Homer, whom he bought as a slave and set free the next day.

In Whitehead's North Carolina, all blacks have been "abolished". Martin Ebel observes the parallel to the Nazi exterminations of Jews and also the parallel between Cora's concealment and Anne Frank's. Another parallel to literature on Nazi Germany may be found in the erection of three gallows by Cora's plantation master. He had the three gallows erected for Cora and her two fellow fugitives to put them to a cruel death as soon as each is returned. In Anna Seghers's novel The Seventh Cross, written in exile between 1938 and 1942, seven prisoners escape from a concentration camp, and the camp commander has a cross erected for each of them to be tortured there after being returned.

Reception

Critical reception
The novel received positive reviews from critics. Reviewers praised it for its commentary on the past and present of the United States.

In 2019, The Underground Railroad was ranked 30th on The Guardians list of the 100 best books of the 21st century. The novel was voted the greatest of its decade in Paste and was third place (along with Jennifer Egan's A Visit from the Goon Squad) in a list by Literary Hub.

Honors and awards
The novel has received a number of awards, including the 2017 Pulitzer Prize for Fiction and the 2016 National Book Award for Fiction. The previous book to win both the Pulitzer and the National Book prizes was The Shipping News, by E. Annie Proulx, in 1993. While awarding the Pulitzer Prize, the committee recognized this novel for a "smart melding of realism and allegory that combines the violence of slavery and the drama of escape in a myth that speaks to contemporary America". The Underground Railroad was also awarded the Arthur C. Clarke Award for science fiction literature and the 2017 Andrew Carnegie Medal for Excellence, and was longlisted for the 2017 Man Booker Prize. When The Underground Railroad was published in the United States in August 2016, it was selected for Oprah's Book Club.

On August 5, 2020, a crater on Pluto's moon Charon was named Cora, after the character in the novel, by the International Astronomical Union's Working Group for Planetary System Nomenclature.

Television adaptation

It was announced in March 2017 that Amazon was making a limited drama series based on The Underground Railroad, written and directed by Barry Jenkins. The series was released on Amazon Prime Video on May 14, 2021.

See also
 Tuskegee Syphilis Study

References

2016 American novels
Novels set in the 19th century
Novels by Colson Whitehead
Novels about American slavery
Pulitzer Prize for Fiction-winning works
National Book Award for Fiction winning works
American alternate history novels
American magic realism novels
Novels set in Georgia (U.S. state)
Novels set in South Carolina
Novels set in North Carolina
Novels set in Tennessee
Novels set in Indiana
Works about the Underground Railroad
American novels adapted into television shows
Doubleday (publisher) books
Antebellum South